Ole Paus (born 9 February 1947; full name Ole Christian Paus) is a Norwegian singer, songwriter, poet and author, who is widely regarded as the foremost troubadour of the contemporary Norwegian ballad tradition. During the 1970s Paus was known for his biting social commentary, especially in his ironic and sometimes libellous "musical newspapers" in the form of broadside ballads in a series of albums titled "The Paus Post". He has later become known for a softer and more lyrical style, and has written some of Norway's best known songs, such as "Innerst i sjelen" and "Engler i sneen". He has often collaborated with Ketil Bjørnstad, notably on the "modern suite" Leve Patagonia; he has later collaborated with Kirkelig Kulturverksted on several projects, and with his son, the classical composer Marcus Paus, notably on the children's opera The Witches, Requiem and several later works. One of his songs, "Mitt lille land", gained wide popularity after the 2011 Norway attacks and was described as "the new national anthem". He has been described as the Norwegian counterpart of Bob Dylan and as the "voice of the nation." Paus was discovered by artists Alf Cranner and Alf Prøysen, and was mentored by André Bjerke, Jens Bjørneboe and Henny Moan. Paus is noted for his consistent use of Norwegian and has been eager for other Norwegian musicians to switch from English to Norwegian.

Background
He is the son of General Ole Otto Paus and a member of the Paus family. He is the father of composer Marcus Paus.

Work
Ole Paus debuted as a singer-songwriter in 1970 and as an author the following year, after he was discovered by Alf Cranner and Alf Prøysen, respectively. He was one of the central figures of the so-called visebølgen i Norge, i.e. troubadours in the tradition of Evert Taube, Cornelis Vreeswijk and others.

Books
 Tekster fra en trapp (1971)
 Det går en narr gjennom byen med ringlende bjeller (1974)
Endelig alene (1984)
Milunia (1985)
Hjemmevant utenfor (1994)
Reisen til Gallia (1998) (with Ketil Bjørnstad)
Kjære Kongen (2002)
Blomstene ved Amras (2004)
Isengaard (2006)

Reviews
Ikke gjør som mora di sier (1987)
For fattig og rik (1988)
Norge mitt Norge (1991)
Sammen igjen (1992)

Discography

Albums
(For peak charting positions, see NorwegianCharts.com)
Der ute - der inne (1970)
Garman (1972)
Blues for Pyttsan Jespersens pårørende (1973)
Ole Bull Show (with Gunnar Bull Gundersen) (1973)
Zarepta (1974)
Lise Madsen, Moses og de andre (with Ketil Bjørnstad) (1975)
I anstendighetens navn (1976)
Paus-posten (1977)
Nye Paus-posten (1977)
Sjikaner i utvalg (1978)
Kjellersanger (1979)
Noen der oppe (1982)
Bjørnstad/Paus/Hamsun (with Ketil Bjørnstad) (1982)
Svarte ringer (1982)
Grensevakt (1984)
Muggen manna (1986)
Stjerner i rennesteinen (1989)
Salmer på veien hjem (with Kari Bremnes og Mari Boine)(1991)
Biggles' testamente (1992)
Mitt lille land (1994)
Hva hjertet ser (1995)
Stopp pressen! Det grøvste fra Paus-posten (1995)
To Rustne Herrer (with Jonas Fjeld) (1996)
Pausposten Extra! (1996)
Det begynner å bli et liv(1998)
Damebesøk (with Jonas Fjeld) (1998)
Den velsignede (2000)
Kildens bredd (with Ketil Bjørnstad) (2002)
Tolv Rustne Strenger (with Jonas Fjeld) (2003)
En bøtte med lys (2004)
Sanger fra et hvitmalt gjerde i sjelen (2005)
Hellige natt - Jul i Skippergata (2006)
Den Store Norske Sangboka (2007)
Paus synger Paus (2009)
Dugnad for Haiti – Live fra Operaen (2010), with other artists
Mitt lille land (2011), with other artists
20 av de beste sangene, vol 1 (2013)
Avslutningen (2013)
Sanger fra gutterommet (2016)

Songs
"I en sofa fra IKEA"
"Innerst i sjelen"
"Mitt lille land" (Peaked at #4 in VG-lista Norwegian Singles Chart)

Opera
Heksene (2007) (libretto)

Filmography
Inntrengeren, (1974) – history of Ole Paus in a TV-series Et lite grøss?
Solstreif, (1980) - as author
De blå ulvene as guest (1993)
Bikinisesongen as Robert (1994)
Upperdog as Axel's father (2009)

TV Specials host
På tide med Ole Paus - TV series presenter (1992–1993, produced by Lasse Halberg and Petter Wallace on TV3) 
Hjemme hos Paus - TV series presenter with Elsa Lystad (1994, produced by Petter Wallace on TV2) 
Ute med Paus TV series presenter (1995 produced by Petter Wallace on TV2)

Honours and awards
 Spellemannprisen, Årets Viseplate (This Year's Folk Song Album), 1976
 Gammleng-prisen, 1995
 Spellemannprisen, Juryens Hederspris (The Jury's Honorary Award), 1998
 Lytterprisen, 1999
 Alf Prøysens Ærespris, 2001,
 Spellemannsprisen, Årets Spellemann (This Year's Spellemann), 2013
 Commander of the Order of St. Olav, 2022

See also
Impact of Alf Prøysen's sexual identity in song lyrics

References

1947 births
Living people
Norwegian artists
Norwegian male artists
Norwegian male singers
Norwegian singer-songwriters
Spellemannprisen winners
Ole
Place of birth missing (living people)
 Norwegian people of Austrian descent